Marco Corbetta (born June 16, 1977) is a game programmer, notable for his work in as lead programmer of Far Cry and Crysis franchise. Corbetta also wrote the 3D engine known as Equinox, before his time at Prograph Research, where he is credited for Tsunami 2265 (2002) (distributed in the US by Got Game Entertainment). He is currently a director on Star Citizen.

External links
Soft Shadows
MobyGames developer profile
Crytek forums account
Kotaku article
Crysis 3 interview

Video game programmers
Living people
1977 births